Kris Cox (born October 22, 1973) is an American professional golfer.

Cox was born in Lafayette, Louisiana. He played college golf at Oklahoma State University where he was a three-time All-American. He won three events at OSU, including the 1996 Big Eight Conference Championship. His team also won the 1995 NCAA Championship. Also as an amateur, Cox was a semi-finalist in 1994 U.S. Amateur and played on the 1995 Walker Cup team.

Cox turned professional in 1996. He played on Nationwide Tour in 1999, 2000, 2005, 2007, and 2009, winning once at the 2005 Permian Basin Charity Golf Classic. He played on the PGA Tour in 2004, 2006, and 2007 where his best finish was T-3 at the 2006 FedEx St. Jude Classic.

Professional wins (2)

Nationwide Tour wins (1)

Other wins (1)
1997 Texas State Open

U.S. national team appearances
Amateur
Walker Cup: 1995

See also
2003 PGA Tour Qualifying School graduates
2005 Nationwide Tour graduates

References

External links

American male golfers
Oklahoma State Cowboys golfers
PGA Tour golfers
Korn Ferry Tour graduates
Golfers from Louisiana
Golfers from Dallas
Sportspeople from Lafayette, Louisiana
1973 births
Living people